Sowdi Sundara Bharathi was an Indian politician and former Member of the Legislative Assembly of Tamil Nadu. He was elected to the Tamil Nadu legislative assembly first as a Swatantra Party and then as Forward Bloc candidate from Aruppukottai constituency in 1967 and  1971 elections.

References 

Tamil Nadu politicians
Swatantra Party politicians
20th-century Indian politicians